Youth (Czech: Mládí) is an outdoor bronze sculpture of a nude young man by Miloš Zet, installed in 1965 outside the Toy Museum at Prague Castle in Prague, Czech Republic.

References

External links

 

Bronze sculptures in the Czech Republic
Nude sculptures in the Czech Republic
Outdoor sculptures in Prague
Prague Castle
Sculptures of men in Prague
Statues in Prague